Rockwell City is a city in Calhoun County, Iowa, United States. The population was 2,240 in 2020. It is the county seat of Calhoun County.

History
Rockwell City was platted in 1876. It is named for its founders, John M. Rockwell, and his wife Charlotte M. Rockwell.

Demographics

2010 census
As of the census of 2010, there were 1,709 people, 773 households, and 471 families residing in the city. The racial makeup of the city was 98.4% White, 0.2% African American, 0.1% Native American, 0.4% Asian, 0.1% from other races, and 0.8% from two or more races. Hispanic or Latino of any race were 0.4% of the population.

There were 773 households, of which 24.7% had children under the age of 18 living with them, 49.3% were married couples living together, 8.7% had a female householder with no husband present, 3.0% had a male householder with no wife present, and 39.1% were non-families. 36.2% of all households were made up of individuals, and 20% had someone living alone who was 65 years of age or older. The average household size was 2.14 and the average family size was 2.77.

The median age in the city was 47.6 years. 21.8% of residents were under the age of 18; 5.9% were between the ages of 18 and 24; 19.5% were from 25 to 44; 27.5% were from 45 to 64; and 25.4% were 65 years of age or older. The gender makeup of the city was 46.6% male and 53.4% female.

2000 census
As of the census of 2000, there were 2,264 people, 818 households, and 503 families residing in the city. The racial makeup of the city was 93.99% White, 3.09% African American, 0.53% Native American, 0.31% Asian, 0.04% Pacific Islander, 0.80% from other races, and 1.24% from two or more races. Hispanic or Latino of any race were 1.68% of the population.

There were 818 households, out of which 25.3% had children under the age of 18 living with them, 52.0% were married couples living together, 7.5% had a female householder with no husband present, and 38.5% were non-families. 36.2% of all households were made up of individuals, and 23.6% had someone living alone who was 65 years of age or older. The average household size was 2.15 and the average family size was 2.79.

18.0% are under the age of 18, 6.4% from 18 to 24, 33.0% from 25 to 44, 21.0% from 45 to 64, and 21.6% who were 65 years of age or older. The median age was 41 years. For every 100 females, there were 125.0 males. For every 100 females age 18 and over, there were 132.9 males.

The median income for a household in the city was $31,071, and the median income for a family was $42,625. Males had a median income of $28,519 versus $22,929 for females. The per capita income for the city was $17,671. About 6.1% of families and 9.5% of the population were below the poverty line, including 9.0% of those under age 18 and 7.7% of those age 65 or over.

Geography
Rockwell City is located at  (42.395906, −94.632946).

Climate
Humid continental climate is a climatic region typified by large seasonal temperature differences, with warm to hot (and often humid) summers and cold (sometimes severely cold) winters. Precipitation is relatively well distributed year-round in many areas with this climate.  The Köppen Climate Classification subtype for this climate is "Dfa" (Hot Summer Continental Climate).

Education
Rockwell City is within the South Central Calhoun Community School District.

It was a part of the Rockwell City Community School District until July 1, 1993, when it merged into the Rockwell City–Lytton Community School District. That in turn merged into South Central Calhoun on July 1, 2014.

Notable people

 Charles G. Boyd, 4-Star General of the United States Air Force was born in rural Rockwell City.
 Hubert Stanley Wall, mathematician, was born in Rockwell City.

Life Magazine feature
In 1958, Rockwell City resident Barry Wichmann, noted for his IQ of 162 Wichmann's school lacked the resources to fully meet his needs, and his high intelligence led to frequent bouts of loneliness. He also suffered from dyscalculia, a learning disability similar to dyslexia. He eventually moved to Winchester, Virginia, where he finished high school and went on to obtain a PhD in clinical psychology from James Madison University.

Arts and culture

Annual events 
Since 2009, Rockwell City has hosted the annual "Sweet Corn Daze" festival, which typically takes place on the first weekend in August and includes a parade, various events, and vendors.

Rockwell City also hosts the annual Calhoun County Expo, Calhoun County's county fair. Rockwell City was selected as the location for the county fair in a county-wide election in 1980. Prior to that time, Calhoun County had two county fairs, one in Rockwell City and one in neighboring Manson. A 1979 state law, however, required counties to select a single county fair to be the "Official State Fair" which necessitated the vote and consolidation of county fairs in Calhoun County (among other Iowa counties).

Landmarks 
Calhoun County Courthouse. The courthouse was constructed in 1914, with an architectural style of Neoclassical Revival and outer walls of limestone, with a red clay tile roof.

Calhoun County Historical Museum. Formerly the building of the Rockwell City High School, this building has been home to the Calhoun County Historical Museum since 1986. The museum traces its origins back to 1902 and seeks to preserve documents and artifacts related to the history and people of Calhoun County. As of January 2023, the museum is open on Sundays from 1-3pm from June to September or by appointment.

Rockwell City Bridge. One of two rainbow bridges in Calhoun County (the other being in Lake City), this bridge was built in 1915 and put into disuse with the realignment of U.S. Highway 20 in 1981. The bridge was added to the National Register of Historic Places in 1998. In 2020, the bridge and some adjacent land was turned into a local park.

Pop culture
On the December 18, 2003, episode of Jeopardy!, the $500 answer in the category "U.S. City Nicknames" was "Rockwell City in this state calls itself the 'Golden buckle on the Corn Belt.' "

See also

 List of cities in Iowa

References

External links

 Chamber of Commerce
 Graphic-Advocate Newspaper
 City-Data Comprehensive Statistical Data and more about Rockwell City

Cities in Calhoun County, Iowa
Cities in Iowa
County seats in Iowa